Richard Thomas James Wilson, Baron Wilson of Dinton,  (born 11 October 1942) is a crossbench member of the British House of Lords and former Cabinet Secretary.

Career
Richard Wilson was born in Glamorgan. He was educated at Radley College (1956–60 and where he much later chaired the College Council (the governing body)) and Clare College, Cambridge (1961–65), where he was awarded the degree of Master of Laws (LLM). He was called to the Bar but, rather than practice, entered the Civil Service as an assistant principal in the Board of Trade in 1966.

He subsequently served in a number of departments including 12 years in the Department of Energy where his responsibilities included nuclear power policy, the privatisation of Britoil, personnel and finance. He headed the Economic Secretariat in the Cabinet Office under Margaret Thatcher from 1987 to 1990 and after two years in the Treasury was appointed Permanent Secretary of the Department of the Environment in 1992.

He became Permanent Under-Secretary of State at the Home Office in 1994 and Secretary of the Cabinet and Head of the Home Civil Service in January 1998, retiring in 2002.

Wilson was appointed a Companion of the Order of the Bath (CB) in the 1991 New Year Honours, promoted to Knight Commander (KCB) in the 1997 New Year Honours and to Knight Grand Cross (GCB) in the 2001 New Year Honours.

After retiring as Cabinet Secretary, he was created a life peer on 18 November 2002 with the title Baron Wilson of Dinton, of Dinton in the County of Buckinghamshire. In September of that year, he was made Master of Emmanuel College, Cambridge. He has variously been a Non-executive Director of British Sky Broadcasting Group plc, Chairman of C. Hoare & Co, a Non-executive Director of Xansa and Chair of the Board of Patrons of The Wilberforce Society.

References

External links
 Interviewed by Alan Macfarlane 20 November 2009 (video)
Emmanuel College website
The Peerage

1942 births
Living people
Wilson of Dinton 
Knights Grand Cross of the Order of the Bath
Welsh civil servants
People educated at Radley College
Alumni of Clare College, Cambridge
Fellows of Emmanuel College, Cambridge
Masters of Emmanuel College, Cambridge
Civil servants in the Board of Trade
Civil servants in the Department of Energy (United Kingdom)
Civil servants in the Cabinet Office
Permanent Under-Secretaries of State for the Environment
Permanent Under-Secretaries of State for the Home Department
Cabinet Secretaries (United Kingdom)
Honorary Fellows of the London School of Economics
Life peers created by Elizabeth II